Still Growing Up: Live & Unwrapped is a DVD film by Hamish Hamilton and Peter Gabriel. It features several live performances from Gabriel's 2004 Still Growing Up tour. The film aims to show Gabriel in a more intimate setting, discarding many of the stage antics featured in Growing Up Live. Bonus features include exclusive interview footage of Gabriel and his live band, live rehearsals of "Darkness", "No Way Out" and "Growing Up", as well as live performances of "Father, Son" and "Downside Up" on Later... with Jools Holland.

Setlist

Still Growing Up Live
 "The Feeling Begins" – 5:00
 "Red Rain" – 6:14
 "Secret World" – 9:20
 "White Ashes" – 4:44
 "Games Without Frontiers" – 6:06
 "Burn You Up, Burn You Down" – 6:30
 "The Tower That Ate People" – 5:11
 "San Jacinto" – 8:27
 "Digging in the Dirt" – 7:40
 "Solsbury Hill" – 4:45
 "Sledgehammer" – 5:12
 "Come Talk To Me" – 9:40
 "Biko" – 8:59

Extras (Bonus Tracks)
 "In Your Eyes" (From The 2004 'Still Growing Up Live' Tour) – 11:48
 "No Self Control" (From The 1988 'This Way Up' World Tour Film 'P.O.V.') – 6:02
 Credits – 1:52

Personnel
 Peter Gabriel – vocals, keyboards
 Richard Evans – guitar
 Melanie Gabriel – vocals
 Tony Levin – bass guitar, vocals
 Ged Lynch – drums
 David Rhodes – guitar
 Rachel Z – keyboards

Peter Gabriel video albums
2005 video albums
Virgin Records video albums
Geffen Records video albums